DNA-damage-inducible transcript 4 like (DDIT4L) or regulated in development and DNA damage response 2 (REDD2) is a protein that in humans is encoded by the DDIT4L gene. The gene is located on chromosome 4 or chromosome 3 in human or mouse respectively.

Function 
DDIT4L is a negative regulator of mTOR. DDIT4L is a stress responsive protein, its expression is increased under the hypoxic condition and causes or sensitize towards cell death through the regulation mTOR activity and reduction of  thioredoxin-1. Cardiomyocytes showed increase expression of DDIT4L under pathological stress, which promoted autophagy through the inhibition of mTORC1, not mTORC2.

Role in Disease 
In fibrosis, nuclear long noncoding RNA (lncRNA) H19X repressed DDIT4L gene expression, specifically interacting with a region upstream of the DDIT4L gene and increased collagen expression and fibrosis. Expression of DDIT4L is increased in pathological cardiac hypertrophy but not in those of physiological cardiac hypertrophy. Such mice had mild systolic dysfunction, increased baseline autophagy, reduced mTORC1 activity, and increased mTORC2 activity.

See also 
 DDIT4/ REDD1
 mTOR
mTORC1
mTORC2

References 

Proteins